The Toyota Second XI or Futures League is the Australian national second XI cricket competition.

Run by Cricket Australia, it is part of its development program and includes the various state and territory second XI teams, from the 2009–10 season until the 2018–19 season, the tournament was renamed the Futures League because a change of rules restricting teams to only have three players over the age of 23; however, from the 2019–20 season, it is now unrestricted. It was previously known as the ACB Cup, and changed to the Cricket Australia Cup when the Australian Cricket Board was renamed to Cricket Australia.

History 
The Cricket Australia Cup (men) was the national second XI competition with playing conditions generally mirroring those of the Pura Cup competition.  The Cricket Australia Cup (women) is generally staged as a week-long tournament involving most states and territories.

However, with the Futures League came a change of rules with games restricted to 3 days and restrictions of 96 first innings overs and 144 overs in total per side, a four-day Futures League Twenty20 tournament was also added which is played in Melbourne during December.

From the 2011–12 season the Second XI competition has returned to four day matches with no over restrictions and six players over the age of 23 allowed to play in the team.

From the 2019–20 season the Second XI competition has not had any age restrictions or quotas.

Teams 
 New South Wales Metro
 Western Australia U-23s
 Queensland U-23s
 Victoria U-23s
 South Australia U-23s
 Tasmania U-23s
 ACT/NSW Country
 Cricket Australia Centre of Excellence (Futures League Twenty20 only)

Champions

Futures League (4 day)

Futures League Twenty20

References

External links
2005 fixtures and points table from Cricket Australia
Cricinfo 2006-07 table

Australian domestic cricket competitions
2006 establishments in Australia
Sports leagues established in 2006